Margus Saar (born April 20, 1966 in Tallinn) is an Estonian television journalist and producer. He was felicitated with the Order of the White Star in 2016.

References

Living people
1966 births
Estonian journalists
Estonian television producers
Estonian editors
Estonian television presenters
Tallinn University of Technology alumni
Recipients of the Order of the White Star, 4th Class
People from Tallinn
21st-century Estonian people